Ildar Akhmadiev (born 1 March 2000) is an Olympic sprinter from Tajikistan.

Personal life
Akhmadiev began training seriously in 2017 and attend the Tajik State Institute of Physical Education in Dushanbe. Akhmadiev is from Tatar descent.

Career
He competed in the preliminary heats in the Athletics at the 2020 Summer Olympics – Men's 100 metres in Tokyo, running a time of 10.66 seconds, now he is a record holder in Tajikistan with personal best time of 10.37 seconds.

References

External links

2000 births
Living people
Athletes (track and field) at the 2020 Summer Olympics
Olympic athletes of Tajikistan
Tajikistani male sprinters
Tatar sportspeople